Vitaliy Boyko (born 3 December 1997) is a Ukrainian professional footballer who plays as an attacking midfielder for Ukrainian club LNZ Cherkasy.

Career
Born in Zolotonosha Raion, Boyko is a product of the local Youth Sportive School.

After playing in a local amateur and lower leagues clubs, he spent a 1 year as player in the Tercera División CF Sant Rafel and in March 2021 Boyko returned to Ukraine and signed a contract with FC Mynai from the Ukrainian Premier League. He made his debut in the Ukrainian Premier League for Mynai on 13 March 2021, playing as the second half-time substituted player in a losing home match against FC Inhulets Petrove. In January 2023 he signed for  LNZ Cherkasy.

References

External links 
 
 
 

1997 births
Living people
Ukrainian footballers
Ukrainian expatriate footballers
FC Zorya-Akademia Bilozirya players
FC Cherkashchyna players
CF Sant Rafel players
FC Mynai players
FC Kremin Kremenchuk players
FC Volyn Lutsk players
FC Lviv players
FC LNZ Cherkasy players
Ukrainian Premier League players
Ukrainian First League players
Ukrainian Second League players
Tercera División players
Expatriate footballers in Spain
Ukrainian expatriate sportspeople in Spain
Association football midfielders
Sportspeople from Cherkasy Oblast